The 2017–18 Ekstraklasa was the 92nd season of the Polish Football Championship, the 84th season of the highest tier domestic division in the Polish football league system since its establishment in 1927 and the 10th season of the Ekstraklasa under its current title. The league was operated by the Ekstraklasa SA.

The season started on 14 July 2017 and concluded on 20 May 2018. It is the first Ekstraklasa season to use VAR. After the 21st matchday the league went on a winter break between 18 December 2017 and 9 February 2018. The regular season was played as a round-robin tournament. A total of 16 teams participated, 14 of which competed in the league during the 2016–17 season, while the remaining two were promoted from the I liga after the 2016–17 season. The fixtures were announced on 8 June 2017.

Each team played a total of 30 matches, half at home and half away. After the 30th round (in the beginning of April 2018), the league split into two groups: championship round (top eight teams) and relegation round (bottom eight teams). Each team played 7 more games (teams ranked 1-4 and 9-12 played four times at home). So, finally each team played a total of 37 matches. The team at the top of the Championship round wins the league title. The two teams at the bottom of the Relegation round are demoted to I liga for the 2018–19 season. This was the fifth season to take place since the new playoff structure has been introduced.

The defending champions were Legia Warsaw, who won their 12th Polish title the previous season.

Legia successfully defended their title, sealing the league trophy for a 13th time in dramatic circumstances as their deciding game against Lech Poznan was abandoned due to flares and pitch invasions by Lech fans (after Legia went 2-0 ahead). Legia were awarded the tie 3-0 and three points secured 1st place.

Teams
Sixteen teams will compete in the league – the top fourteen teams from the previous season, as well as two teams promoted from the I liga. Sandecja Nowy Sącz were promoted to the Ekstraklasa for the first time. Górnik Zabrze returned to Ekstraklasa after a one-year absence.

Stadiums and locations
Note: Table lists in alphabetical order.

 Sandecja Nowy Sącz will play their home games in Nieciecza until their home ground (Stadion im. Ojca Władysława Augustynka) fulfills license requirements.
 Upgrading to 31,871.

Personnel and kits

Managerial changes

Regular season

League table

Positions by round

Results

Play-offs

Championship round

League table

Positions by round

Results

Relegation round

League table

Positions by round

Results

Season statistics

Top goalscorers

Top assists

Hat-tricks

Attendances

Awards

Annual awards

See also
 2017–18 I liga
 2017–18 Polish Cup

References

External links
  
Ekstraklasa at uefa.com

2017-18
Pol
1